Jaziel Mariscal Escandón (born July 28, 1994, in Culiacán, Sinaloa) is a Mexican professional footballer who last played for Murciélagos F.C.

References

External links
 

1994 births
Living people
Mexican footballers
Murciélagos FC footballers
Ascenso MX players
Liga Premier de México players
Tercera División de México players
Footballers from Sinaloa
Sportspeople from Culiacán
Association footballers not categorized by position